Iss Pyaar Ko Kya Naam Doon? Ek Baar Phir ( What shall we name this love? Once again) is an Indian romantic drama television series created and produced by Sunjoy Waddhwa under Sphere Origins. The series aired on StarPlus from 26 August 2013 to 13 June 2015, completing 542 episodes. The show stars Avinash Sachdev and Shrenu Parikh as Shlok and Aastha, respectively. It is the second installment in the Iss Pyaar Ko Kya Naam Doon? series.

Set and filmed in Pune, Maharastra, the show revolves around Shlok Agnihotri (Avinash Sachdev) and Aastha Kirloskar (Shrenu Parikh). It tells the story of Shlok, a cunning business executive who is struggling with a recent break-up that ultimately shapes his chauvinistic personality, which governs his course of actions. Shlok becomes entangled in a world of chauvinistic beliefs and hatred for love. Aastha, a progressive and liberal girl who is committed to drive toward change, and her attempts to foster equality, meets Shlok who becomes irritated by Aastha’s nature. Shlok indulges in fake love and marries Aastha, mainly driven by a desire to take revenge under the mistaken impression of the reputational damage of himself and his family, while navigating the interplay between his intended revenge and the emotions of love. The series also depicts domestic violence, addressing a common social issue. 

Among the show’s co-stars are Manish Wadhwa and Geetanjali Tikekar as Shlok’s father Niranjan Agnihotri and mother Anjali Agnihotri, and Tushar Dalvi and Prachee Shah as Aastha’s father Avdhoot Kirloskar and mother Kalindi Kirloskar, two families that have extremely clashing beliefs about gender equality. Others include Aarav Chowdhary and Dolly Minhas as Indrajeet Sarkar and Ahilya Vinas who, after settling in Pune, immediately form a deceiving plan to take over the Agnohitri’s wealth. 

Iss Pyaar Ko Kya Naam Doon? Ek Baar Phir is the first television series on StarPlus to broadcast at a non-prime time slot at 6:00 PM (IST). The show generated higher than expected audience viewership in the first few weeks of its premiere, creating a trend as the new prime-time slot.

Plot
Aastha is a cheerful, lively, passionate and charming woman who values relationships and supports equality. In contrast, Shlok is an arrogant, self-reserved and business-minded man who believes in wealth more than relationships. He had a miserable past that ultimately led him to his arrogance.

Shlok is informed about a breach of academic integrity at one of his university institutions. He suspends the boys but expels the girl. Later, the Agnihotri's are invited to an award event to recognize their reputation in the education industry for their business. Aastha learns that Shlok had done injustice to the girl. At the event, she questions Shlok about his negligence after which it gets recorded live and gets exposed to the public. The public labels Shlok and his family as supporters of inequality which leads to their business getting raided. Shlok mistakenly believes that Aastha is responsible for the consistent insult of his family, his father in particular, and decides to take revenge.

Shlok shows fake love to Aastha and marries her on false pretenses. During the night of their Suhag Raat, Shlok breaks Aastha's wedding necklace and reveals to her that he never loved her and that he only married her to take revenge, leaving Aastha heartbroken. Shlok angrily tells Aastha that he showed fake love in order to take revenge for the insult of himself and his father. He goes as far as to threaten her that if she reveals this to anyone, he'd have her father framed in a case of corruption. Meanwhile, Anjali wants Aastha to perfectly adapt to the Agnihotri traditions. Varad arranges a honeymoon for Shlok and Aastha. Despite Aastha's efforts to cancel the honeymoon, Shlok and Aastha leave. On the way to their honeymoon, Aastha escapes and gets lost in a jungle. While searching for Aastha, Shlok meets with her and they both spend their planned "honeymoon" in a jungle while trying to find their way out.

Aastha learns that her father, Avdhoot, is imprisoned. She assumes that Shlok sent him to jail and vents her anger at him. In return, Shlok tries to prove his innocence that he did not send him to jail. Disappointed, Aastha reveals the truth to her family and the in-laws about her marriage and Shlok's planned revenge; they are shocked. Kalindi wants Aastha to file for divorce. At the first court hearing, Aastha is ordered by the court to stay with Shlok for six months. During the six months, Aastha discovers Shlok's miserable past; in which Shlok is actually an innocent and good person. Aastha finds out that Shlok was in love with a girl named Swati and that their break-up led to his hatred of women. It is shown that Niranjan ordered Anjali to hate Swati, simply because she was against the Agnihotri traditions which ultimately led to Shlok's break-up, in which Shlok blames Anjali, leaving him heartbroken onwards. While attempting to bring back Shlok's true personality, Aastha falls in love with Shlok and confesses her love to him.

Aditi, who is the daughter of a close friend of Niranjan, arrives at the Agnihotri mansion and acts as an imposter to separate Shlok and Aastha. Aditi attempts to kill Aastha multiple times but she is saved by Shlok. Aditi kidnaps Aastha but Shlok rescues her just as Aditi is about to shoot her. It is revealed that Aditi is Swati's sister and her main motive was to kill Aastha so that Shlok will suffer. Aditi believes that Shlok is the reason for Swati's deteriorating health. Shlok is shocked to see Swati who soon passes away. Shlok realizes his love for Aastha and confesses his love to her. They both consummate their marriage. At the end of the 6 months, Shlok and Aastha both state that they do not want to divorce each other.

Shlok's sister, Jyoti, runs away from her misogynistic in-laws after they want abortion for the third time for her unborn baby girl. While running away, she meets the charming Siddharth who happens to be Aastha's cousin. Unaware of Jyoti's situation, Siddharth takes care of her. He sends her to Kalindi's house who is shocked to see her. Jyoti explains everything to Kalindi. Abhay and Sulbha craft a plan to tell the Agnihotri family and make them believe they are innocent and that Jyoti has run away. Siddharth slowly falls in love with Jyoti. During Anjali's birthday celebration, Abhay finds Jyoti and the family is shocked to see her. She pleads to Niranjan to let her stay with them. Aastha manages to get Abhay arrested.

Aastha witnesses Niranjan showing his violent behavior towards Anjali and learns the truth about Niranjan's true nature and how he is the one who controls Anjali to mask his ill desires. When Aastha confronts Anjali about their relationship, they both get emotional when Anjali accepts that Niranjan has her helpless. Aastha promises Anjali that she will unfold Niranjan's true nature and that she will erase the false impression that everyone has of Anjali. Niranjan wants Abhay released from jail and asks Anjali to make Jyoti sign the bail papers. Jyoti begins to develop hatred towards her mother. When Niranjan manages to indirectly make Jyoti sign the bail papers, Abhay forces Jyoti to take her home. Anjali stops this from happening and Niranjan is enraged. However, Jyoti begins to see Anjali's sweet nature. Abhay kidnaps Jyoti's daughter and Shlok beats him up. After convincing the family, Siddharth and Jyoti finally get married.

Aastha tries to expose Niranjan's true identity to Shlok several times, but he does not believe her. She manages to get hold of a recording where Niranjan is seen confessing his bad intentions, but Niranjan destroys the evidence. Afraid that Aastha might succeed to expose Niranjan, he begins to create misunderstandings between Shlok and Aastha. Aastha goes on to blame Niranjan for controlling Anjali and not caring for Jyoti. Angered by Aastha's accusations, Shlok decides to divide the house and orders Aastha to stay in one part of the house. Aastha is immediately joined by Anjali after which she also blames Niranjan for deceiving everyone. Niranjan is dumbfounded seeing Anjali go against him. But soon after, Jyoti witnesses Niranjan admitting his actions towards Jyoti and badmouthing Anjali. She is devastated to see her father's true nature. She joins Anjali and Aastha, and tells Shlok that he is being deceived.

Soon after, Niranjan learns that Aastha has evidence against him and destroys it. Niranjan has Aastha kidnapped and tied to a soon-to-be burning statute. Niranjan stops Anjali from saving her and takes her away. Anjali criticizes Niranjan. Shlok rescues Aastha and she takes him where Niranjan is seen confessing his wrongdoings to Anjali. Shlok finally learns the truth about his father and is devastated. Shlok repents his misdeeds with Anjali and Aastha. He gets emotional thinking about his past; his mistreatment of Anjali, and his misunderstanding of Aastha. Shlok addresses Anjali as his mother and embraces her. They both get emotional. The next day, Shlok, Aastha and Anjali leave the Agnihotri mansion. Shlok and Aastha start earning a living by operating a food truck business and living modestly. The absence of Shlok has Niranjan feeling lonely. He realizes his mistakes and regrets his actions.

Varad foolishly signs a contract with Indrajeet Sarkar and the Agnihotri's lose their business and house. Niranjan is desperate to find Shlok. When he meets with Shlok, Aastha, and Anjali he asks for forgiveness and is forgiven. Varad also asks for forgiveness for his foolishness and is forgiven. The reunited Agnihotri family live together in a small house. The Agnihotri's skillfully develop a plan to get their assets back from the Sarkar's.

Shlok and Aastha disguise themselves as Balvankar Singh and Sapna to get their lost assets back; Aastha works as Indrajeet's assistant and Shlok works as his children's caretaker. They precisely work together to possess the Power of Attorney documents. Eventually, Shlok and Aastha manage to get hold of the papers. On the day they get everything back, the Sarkar's reveal a shocking truth to the Agnihotri's that leaves Anjali shattered and the rest of the family shocked. Shortly after, Shlok, Anjali and Aastha meet in an accident in which Shlok goes into a coma, Anjali dies and Aastha loses her memory. Niranjan is so devastated by Anjali's death, that he goes insane and never recovers.

When Shlok wakes up from the coma, he is devastated upon learning that Anjali died in the accident. He inquires about Aastha in which Varad says she is missing. After a desperate search, Shlok finally meets with Aastha who is unable to recognize him, leaving Shlok heartbroken. It is revealed that Indrajeet took advantage of Aastha's memory loss and led her to believe that he is her husband. Shlok begins to recreate previous events so that Aastha regains her memory, angering Indrajeet. On the day of their marriage to Indrajeet, he has Shlok abducted. Slowly recalling her past, Aastha's mother, Kalindi, helps Aastha remember. Shlok manages to stop the marriage and rescues Aastha. Aastha is delighted to see Shlok. Indrajeet is arrested. Shlok and Aastha adopt Indrajeet's children and live happily together.

Cast

Main
Avinash Sachdev as Shlok Agnihotri: Aastha’s husband, the president and CEO of Agnihotri Educational Trust Inc. who, shortly after his miserable breakup, becomes a troubled chauvinistic business tycoon who often discourages and degrades women’s achievements. As his dynamic nature progresses, Shlok gains a fabricated reputation for opening educational institutions for those who are less fortunate. (2013-2015)

Shrenu Parikh as Aastha Agnihotri (née Kirloskar) : Shlok’s wife, a fearless, liberal, and optimistic girl who strives to encourage equality, navigates the complexities of the Agnihotri residence determined to establish change. Aastha has passionate beliefs about equality and inspires women in her family to rise to their importance. (2013-2015)

Recurring
Manish Wadhwa as Niranjan Agnihotri: Shlok’s father, Anjali’s husband, a wealthy businessman who increasingly becomes violent and masks his intentions to deceive his family and escalates domestic violence against his wife to impose regressive household traditions. Niranjan is seen as a man who is skilled in manipulation and deception. He holds misogynistic beliefs and uses his wife to carry out his intentions. (2013-2015)

Geetanjali Tikekar as Anjali Agnihotri (née Godbole) : Shlok’s mother, Niranjan’s wife who, initially is seen as a strict and controlling mother-in-law, is later revealed she is suffering from spousal dominance and unwillingly devalues women and promotes inferiority household traditions. She begins to reveal her true emotions towards her children after Aastha’s frequent attempts to nurture change, which ultimately causes anger to Niranjan. (2013-2015)

Samir Sharma as Varad Agnihotri: Shlok’s elder brother, Sojal’s husband, a media director.  (2013-2015)

Shalmalee Desai as Sojal Agnihotri: Varad’s wife; Kavya's mother (2013-2015)

Grace Girdhar as Kavya Agnihotri: Varad and Sojal’s daughter (2013-2015)

Sachin Parikh as Vinayak Agnihotri: Niranjan’s younger brother, a talented artist who has a friendly personality and is often seen unassociated with other men in the Agnihotri family. He does not support or participate in regressive traditions. (2013-2014)

Manjushree Kulkarni as Jaya: Sojal’s mother, a foodie who has an obsession with materialistic pleasure and often serves as the series’ comic relief. (2013-2015)

Tushar Dalvi as Avdhoot Kirloskar: Aastha’s father, Kalindi’s husband (2013-2015)

Prachee Shah as Kalindi Kirloskar: Aastha’s mother, Avdhoot’s wife (2013-2015)

Minal Karpe as ‘’Ajju’’: Aastha’s grandmother, Avdhoot’s mother (2013-2015)

Deep Jaitley as Abhay Deshmukh: Jyoti’s ex-husband, a cruel and aggressively violent husband who verbally, physically, and emotionally tortures his wife in the event of self-dissatisfaction. Abhay uses his wife to release cheques, issued by Shlok, to wrongfully gain financial stability. (2013-2014)

Sheetal Dabholkar as Jyoti Lokhande (née Agnihotri) (formerly Deshmukh): Shlok’s sister, Abhay’s ex-wife, Siddharth’s wife who, suffering from abuse, reluctantly goes through illegal abortion twice that compels her to escape from her misogynistic and torturous in-laws who plan to abort her third unborn child on the basis of gender. (2013-2015)

Pratibha Goregaonkar as Sulabha Deshmukh: Jyoti’s ex-mother-in-law, Abhay’s mother who seeks to acquire jewelry in exchange for monetary value from the Agnihotri’s while assisting Abhay to set an unpleasant atmosphere around Jyoti. (2013-2014)

Karan Gangwal as Suresh: Shlok’s assistant (2013-2014)

Shivani Tomar as Swati: Shlok’s ex-girlfriend who breaks up with Shlok after she is told to adapt to the Agnihotri traditions by Anjali, forcing her to abruptly end her relationship with Shlok. (2013-2014)

Neha Sargam as Aditi: Shlok and Aastha’s enemy, Swati's sister. With an initial unclear motive, she attempts to separate Shlok and Aastha. It is later revealed she is motivated by her obsessive desire to eliminate love from Shlok’s life as Aditi holds Shlok responsible for Swati’s unstable health condition. (2014)

Ankit Modgil as Siddharth Lokhande: Jyoti’s second husband, Aastha’s cousin. A humble, joyful, and charming boy enters Jyoti’s life as a relief and provides accommodation after Jyoti runs away from her in-laws during her pregnancy. Siddharth helps Jyoti and has the desire to make her feel happy and at ease eventually falling in love with her. (2014-2015)

Nupur Alankar as Renuka Lokhande: Siddharth’s mother (2014-2015)

Sharmin Kazi as Riya Lokhande: Siddharth’s sister (2014)

Kabeer Maira as Ankush Joshi: Aastha’s half-brother, Kalindi’s son, an undisciplined and unmannered son who is required to reside with Kalindi indefinitely to obtain his property. During his stay, he causes disruption and mischief aimed to irritate Kalindi and her family. (2014-2015)

Anchal Sabharwal as Mansi: Varad’s extra marital affair. (2014-2015)

Aakshi Khari as Apsara, a chirpy village girl who has a self-obsession of her looks. (2014-2015)

Priya Raina as Dr. Surbhi: Shlok’s childhood friend, a medical doctor who treats Aastha’s memory loss. (2015)

Aarav Chowdhary as Indrajeet Sarkar: An ambitious businessman who illegitimately obtains the Power of Attorney on all of the Agnihotri’s assets by deception, motived to defame the Agnihotri’s earned reputation. Indrajeet takes advantage of Aastha’s memory loss and acts as her husband. He illegally changes Aastha’s identity as Barkha. (2015)

Dolly Minhas as Ahilya Vinas: A woman who holds strong hatred for Niranjan and has deliberate attempts to destroy Niranjan and his family and dishonestly claims ownership on Niranjan’s properties. (2015)

Roma Bali as Kavita Vinas: Ahliya’s daughter (2015)

Swati Rajput as Poornima Sarkar: Indrajeet’s sister (2015)

Lakshya Wahi as Shantanu Sarkar: Indrajeet’s son (2015)

Reet Sharma as Mishti Sarkar: Indrajeet’s daughter (2015)

Satish Sharma as Pradeep Vinas: Indrajeet’s uncle (2015)

Jaanvi Sangwan as Mousami Vinas: Indrajeet’s aunt (2015)

Production

Conception
Iss Pyaar Ko Kya Naam Doon? Ek Baar Phir was created by Sunjoy Waddhwa. Waddhwa wanted to create a series different than that of season one and stated that creating a sequel for the television medium is challenging. Waddhwa expresses that “viewers may watch the first couple of episodes for curiosity but will stop if there is no quality content…”. The network StarPlus and Waddhwa took this into consideration when planning the creation of Iss Pyaar Ko Kya Naam Doon? Ek Baar Phir by introducing its viewers to a new story, characters and theme.

Development
The filming of the series began in April 2013. The name of the show was not finalised until months into production as tentative titles were being considered by StarPlus. Initially, the production team considered titles that included: Dard-E-Dil, Iss Dil Ka Kya Karoon, or Aastha, but ultimately chose Iss Pyaar Ko Kya Naam Doon? Ek Baar Phir. Consequently, it became the second entry of the Iss Pyaar Ko Kya Naam Doon? franchise. In August 2013, StarPlus announced the launch of the series to premiere later that month. StarPlus expected Waddhwa to produce a character or theme-driven storyline as they claimed that audience expectations are higher in sequels.

Casting
Avinash Sachdev was selected to play Shlok Agnihotri. He auditioned for the show in January 2013 but did not begin shooting until April 2013. Sachdev claims his preparation for the role was difficult because portraying an anti-hero role, and at the same time, illustrating a love story was challenging. Shrenu Parikh was selected to portray Aastha Agnihotri.

Filming
Principal photography for the series began in April 2013, with opening scenes shot in Wai, Maharashtra. Iss Pyaar Ko Kya Naam Doon? Ek Baar Phir is predominantly filmed in Pune, Maharashtra and uses a multiple-camera mode of production.

Broadcast
Iss Pyaar Ko Kya Naam Doon? Ek Baar Phir’s first promo was released on 13 August 2013. It featured Sachdev and Parikh and mainly depicted Shlok’s defamatory actions towards women at their attempts to rise the ranks of the corporate and political industry. Additional promos were later released and showcased a similar theme.

Iss Pyaar Ko Kya Naam Doon? Ek Baar Phir premiered its first episode on 26 August 2013 on StarPlus. It initially aired Monday to Friday at 6:00 PM (IST). In 2014, the network aired its series from Monday through Saturday, changing to a six-day format. On 26 January 2015, StarPlus shifted the show’s telecast to an earlier time slot at 5:30 PM (IST) after being granted an extension. StarPlus announced that this decision was based on series doing well at non-prime slots, further experimenting with the channel’s reach at earlier timings, hoping to capture more viewers.

Iss Pyaar Ko Kya Naam Doon? Ek Baar Phir was made digitally available on 11 February 2015 on the video-on-demand streaming service Disney+ Hotstar.

Reception

Critical response
India TV described the series as “capitalising on domestic violence to get eyeballs” while they criticised the character Niranjan Agnihotri (Manish Wadhwa), for showing some of the most intimidating scenes. India TV observed Niranjan as someone “…who hides and manipulates the truth about himself, uses his wife to impose his regressive set-out rules and undermine his family members behind their back.” Times of India noted that the depiction of aggressive husbands are becoming hit stories.

Viewership
Despite the series airing at an early time slot, Iss Pyaar Ko Kya Naam Doon? Ek Baar Phir managed to acquire good ratings throughout its run. The show's audience increased from 1.39 to 2.61 million viewership. In week 50 of 2013, the show saw another spike from 2.61 to 3.40 million impressions. Iss Pyaar Ko Kya Naam Doon? Ek Baar Phir set a trend as the new prime time slot for daily television shows as early as 6:00 PM (IST).

In the first week of 2014, the series gained 1.70 TVR. In week 23 of 2014, the show grossed an audience of 2.80 million with a 1.30 TVR. In the following week, Iss Pyaar Ko Kya Naam Doon? Ek Baar Phir drew 3.0 million viewers with 1.40 TVR. Iss Pyaar Ko Kya Naam Doon? Ek Baar Phir held an average audience of 3.10 million viewers in week 30 of 2014, an increase from 2.80 million viewers from the previous week. 

With the show’s change in the story near the end of 2014, ‘’Iss Pyaar Ko Kya Naam Doon? Ek Baar Phir’’ saw a drop in the TRP and StarPlus announced its potential off-air date in February 2015. However, the filmmakers were able to improve the ratings and the show ultimately received an extension until June 2015. 

In the United Kingdom, on 8 April 2014, the channel recorded a viewership of 178.5 K impressions. As the weeks progressed, the ratings further reached 214.7 K impressions. Hence, Iss Pyaar Ko Kya Naam Doon? Ek Baar Phir registered as the first show on the UK Asian television channel to acquire a record-high rating in that time slot.

Adaptations
Iss Pyaar Ko Kya Naam Doon? Ek Baar Phir inspired several multilingual dubs and adaptations.

National 
in Malayalam language as Mounam Sammatham 2 aired on Asianet Plus also streams on Hotstar. 
in Telugu language as Geetha Govindam aired on Star Maa also streams on Hotstar.

International 
in Africa as Strange Love in English language aired on Star Life
in Armenia as Inchpes Kochel Ays Sere 2 in Armenian language aired on Armenia TV
in Canada and the United States as Iss Pyaar Ko Kya Naam Doon? Ek Baar Phir subtitled in English language transmitted by ATN on StarPlus Canada and US.   
in Indonesia as Inikah Cinta? in Indonesian language aired on SCTV
in Russia as как назвать эту любовь? 2 in Russian language aired on Russian TV
in Turkey as Tatlı Bela in Turkish language aired on Kanal 7
in the United Kingdom as What Shall I Name This Love? Once Again subtitled in English language aired on StarPlus UK.

References

External links
Iss Pyaar Ko Kya Naam Doon? Ek Baar Phir: Sphere Origins

StarPlus original programming
2013 Indian television series debuts
2015 Indian television series endings
Indian drama television series
Indian television soap operas